Brent P. Dlugach (born March 3, 1983) is an American former baseball shortstop who played for the Detroit Tigers in 2009.

Career

Amateur
Dlugach played college baseball at the University of Memphis where he was named a second-team Conference USA selection as a junior. In 2003, he played collegiate summer baseball with the Hyannis Mets of the Cape Cod Baseball League.

Detroit Tigers
Dlugach was selected by the Tigers in the 6th round of the 2004 Major League Baseball Draft.  He played in Single-A from 2004–06 and was promoted to Triple-A Toledo Mud Hens late in 2006 and played in all of Toledo's playoff games.  Dlugach missed most of the 2007 and 2008 minor league seasons after injuring his shoulder.  In 2009, Dlugach spent the majority of the season at Toledo and was named to the International League All-Star team.

Dlugach was called up to the Tigers on September 1, 2009, when the MLB rosters expanded.

Boston Red Sox
On November 4, 2010 he was traded from the Tigers to the Boston Red Sox for a player to be named later or cash. On December 21, 2010, he was designated for assignment by the Boston Red Sox to make room for Bobby Jenks.

Second Stint with Tigers
On February 2, 2012, Dlugach signed a minor league deal with the Tigers and was assigned to Double-A Erie. He was promoted to Triple-A Toledo on April 3. He was let go following the 2012 campaign and has yet to sign with another club.

References

External links

Baseball players from Arkansas
Baseball shortstops
Detroit Tigers players
Erie SeaWolves players
Gulf Coast Tigers players
Lakeland Tigers players
Oneonta Tigers players
Toledo Mud Hens players
West Michigan Whitecaps players
Memphis Tigers baseball players
Hyannis Harbor Hawks players
Pawtucket Red Sox players
1983 births
Living people